Toroidal coordinates are a three-dimensional orthogonal coordinate system that results from rotating the two-dimensional bipolar coordinate system about the axis that separates its two foci. The focal ring is also known as the reference circle.

Definition

The most common definition of toroidal coordinates  is

together with ).

Coordinate surfaces

Surfaces of constant  correspond to spheres of different radii

that all pass through the focal ring but are not concentric.  The surfaces of constant  are non-intersecting tori of different radii

that surround the focal ring. The centers of the constant- spheres lie along the -axis, whereas the constant- tori are centered in the  plane.

Inverse transformation

The  coordinates may be calculated from the Cartesian coordinates (x, y, z) as follows.  The azimuthal angle  is given by the formula

The cylindrical radius  of the point P is given by

The coordinate  equals the natural logarithm of the focal distances

whereas  equals the angle between the rays to the foci, which may be determined from the law of cosines

Or explicitly, including the sign,

where .

The transformations between cylindrical and toroidal coordinates can be expressed in complex notation as

Scale factors

whereas the azimuthal scale factor equals

Thus, the infinitesimal volume element equals

Differential Operators
The Laplacian is given by 

For a vector field  the Vector Laplacian is given by

Other differential operators such as  
and  can be expressed in the coordinates  by substituting 
the scale factors into the general formulae 
found in orthogonal coordinates.

Toroidal harmonics

Standard separation 

The 3-variable Laplace equation 

admits solution via separation of variables in toroidal coordinates. Making the substitution

A separable equation is then obtained. A particular solution obtained by separation of variables is:

where each function is a linear combination of:

Where P and Q are associated Legendre functions of the first and second kind. These Legendre functions are often referred to as toroidal harmonics.

Toroidal harmonics have many interesting properties.  If you make a variable substitution  then, for instance, with vanishing order  (the convention is to not write the order when it vanishes) and 

and

The rest of the toroidal harmonics can be obtained, for instance, in terms of the complete elliptic integrals, by using recurrence relations for associated Legendre functions.

The classic applications of toroidal coordinates are in solving partial differential equations, 
e.g., Laplace's equation for which toroidal coordinates allow a separation of variables or the Helmholtz equation, for which toroidal coordinates do not allow a separation of variables. Typical examples would be the electric potential and electric field of a conducting torus, or in the degenerate case, an electric current-ring (Hulme 1982).

An alternative separation
Alternatively, a different substitution may be made (Andrews 2006)

where 

Again, a separable equation is obtained. A particular solution obtained by separation of variables is then:

where each function is a linear combination of:

This method is useful for situations in which the boundary conditions are independent of the spherical angle , such as the charged ring, an infinite half plane, or two parallel planes. For identities relating the toroidal harmonics with argument hyperbolic
cosine with those of argument hyperbolic cotangent, see the Whipple formulae.

References
Byerly, W E.  (1893) An elementary treatise on Fourier's series and spherical, cylindrical, and ellipsoidal harmonics, with applications to problems in mathematical physics Ginn & co. pp. 264–266

Bibliography

External links
MathWorld description of toroidal coordinates

Three-dimensional coordinate systems
Orthogonal coordinate systems